Lanka IOC PLC is a subsidiary of Indian Oil Corporation which operates retail petrol and diesel stations in Sri Lanka. LIOC is Sri Lanka's only private sector organisation retailing fuels with an island-wide distribution network of 211 retail outlasts. Its headquarters in the Colombo City, Colombo.

History 
The company was incorporated in 2003 as LIOC. Indian parent company Indian Oil Company owned the majority of LIOC's stock, and N.K Nayyar served as its first chairman. Before 2002, petroleum fuel retailing in the country was at the rudimentary level, limited to mere sales of auto fuel only. After the 2002 Sri Lankan Government's decision to liberalise the petroleum sector where the CPC will compete with the private sector. Indian Oil Corporation, will invest Rs. 10 billion (US$62 million for the first phase, US$38 million would be invested in the second phase) in Sri Lanka and will operate 100 fuel stations which it has purchased from the Ceylon Petroleum Corporation In 2003, Sri Lankan Government give to 15 Trincomalee oil tanks, on a 35 years lease for an annual payment of US$100,000. In 2022 Sri Lankan cabinet approved to implementation of a development project by a company named Trinco Petroleum Terminal for the remaining 61 tanks, of which 51% will be owned by CEYPTCO and 49% by LIOC. Trincomalee oil tanks farm is estimated to be valued at US$500 million. The event became known as the 2022 Sri Lankan economic crisis Sri Lanka has faced energy crisis. With no foreign exchange to pay for fuel, Sri Lanka Government was dependent on an Indian line of credit of US$700 million which expired in June. The LIOC to date was enjoying a 16% market share for petrol and diesel in the local market. For lubricants, bitumen and oil bunkering its market share is over 35%. The fuel shortfalls have also led to long lines at petrol and diesel stations over the past months. IOC supply is supported by an Indian Line of Credit of US$500 million. In August 2022 Sri Lanka's Ministry of Power and Energy has authorised the establishment of 50 new fuel stations by Lanka IOC.

Listing and shareholding
Lanka IOC's equity shares are listed on the Colombo Stock Exchange.

Finances

References

External links

Indian Oil Corporation
Oil and gas companies of Sri Lanka
Companies listed on the Colombo Stock Exchange
Sri Lankan companies established in 2002
Energy companies established in 2002